Carex lessoniana, also commonly known as rautahi or cutty grass, is a tussock-forming species of perennial sedge in the family Cyperaceae. It is native to parts of New Zealand.

Description
The dull brown or red-brown basal sheaths have margins that deteriorate to fibres that are wrapped around the culm. It has many leaves, usually many more than the culms. It flowers between October and December and fruits between December and April.

Taxonomy
The species was described in 1840 by the botanist Ernst Gottlieb von Steudel as a part of the work Nomenclator botanicus. It has one synonym; Carex polystachya. C. lessoniana is closely allied with Carex coriacea, Carex germinata and Carex terneria. The specific epithet honours the French botanist and surgeon René Primevère Lesson.

Distribution
The plant is usually situated in lowland and coastal areas often located in areas of wet alluvial forests or along the edge of peat swamps. It is endemic to New Zealand and is found on both the North Island and the South Island. It is more common on the North Island where is much more wise spread. In the South Island it is mostly found in the northern half and much less common in the southern portion.

See also
List of Carex species

References

lessoniana
Plants described in 1840
Taxa named by Ernst Gottlieb von Steudel
Flora of New Zealand